The grand final of the 2018–19 Curling World Cup took place from May 8 to 12, 2019 in Beijing, China.

Canada's Jennifer Jones defeated Switzerland's Silvana Tirinzoni in the women's final. Canada's Kevin Koe defeated China's Zou Qiang in the men's final and Norway's Kristin Skaslien and Magnus Nedregotten defeated Canada's pair of Laura Walker and Kirk Muyres in the mixed doubles final.

Format

Curling World Cup matches have eight ends, rather than the standard ten ends. Ties after eight ends will be decided by a shoot-out, with each team throwing a stone and the one closest to the button winning. A win in eight or fewer ends will earn a team 3 points, a shoot-out win 2 points, a shoot-out loss 1 point, and 0 points for a loss in eight or fewer ends.

Each event will have eight teams in the men's, women's, and mixed doubles tournament. The teams will be split into two groups of four, based on the Curling World Cup rankings, whereby the 1st, 3rd, 5th, and 7th, ranked teams will be in one group and the 2nd, 4th, 6th, and 8th ranked teams in the other. The first place teams in each group will play against each other in the final. In the event of a tie for first place, a shoot-out will be used, with the same format used to decide matches tied after eight ends.

Qualification

The host (China), the winners of each leg, the current world champions, a team specifically invited, and the two highest remaining member associations on the Curling World Cup ranking list will qualify for the grand final. Two separate teams from the same member association may qualify for the grand final.

The following countries qualified for each discipline:

Notes
  Team Homan is being replaced by a team consisting of Jennifer Jones, Kaitlyn Lawes, Shannon Birchard and Jill Officer due to Homan and her second Joanne Courtney being due to give birth in the summer.
  The 2018 World Mixed Doubles Curling Champions, Michèle Jäggi and Sven Michel, were selected to compete due to the short time between the 2019 championship and the grand final.
  With Team Edin already qualified for the grand final, Switzerland, the highest-ranked country not yet qualified, was invited.
  In each discipline, the WCF chose to invite the highest-ranked country not yet qualified.

Women

Teams

Round-robin standings

Round-robin results

Draw 1
Wednesday, May 8, 15:00

Draw 4
Thursday, May 9, 08:30

Draw 5
Thursday, May 9, 12:00

Draw 6
Thursday, May 9, 16:00

Draw 7
Thursday, May 9, 19:30

Draw 8
Friday, May 10, 08:30

Draw 9
Friday, May 10, 12:00

Draw 10
Friday, May 10, 16:00

Draw 11
Friday, May 10, 19:30

Draw 12
Saturday, May 11, 08:30

Draw 13
Saturday, May 11, 12:00

Draw 15
Saturday, May 11, 19:30

Final
Sunday, May 12, 16:00

Men

Teams

Round-robin standings

Round-robin results

Draw 3
Wednesday, May 8, 21:00

Draw 5
Thursday, May 9, 12:00

Draw 7
Thursday, May 9, 19:30

Draw 9
Friday, May 10, 12:00

Draw 10
Friday, May 10, 16:00

Draw 12
Saturday, May 11, 08:30

Draw 14
Saturday, May 11, 16:00

Final
Sunday, May 12, 09:00

Mixed doubles

Teams

Round-robin standings

Round-robin results

Draw 2
Wednesday, May 8, 18:30

Draw 4
Thursday, May 9, 08:30

Draw 6
Thursday, May 9, 16:00

Draw 8
Friday, May 10, 08:30

Draw 9
Friday, May 10, 12:00

Draw 10
Friday, May 10, 16:00

Draw 11
Friday, May 10, 19:30

Draw 13
Saturday, May 11, 12:00

Draw 14
Saturday, May 11, 16:00

Draw 15
Saturday, May 11, 19:30

Final
Sunday, May 12, 13:00

References

External links
 

Curling World Cup
Curling World Cup - Grand Final
Curling World Cup - Grand Final
International curling competitions hosted by China
Curling World Cup - Grand Final
Sports competitions in Beijing
2010s in Beijing